The Czech Wikipedia is the Czech language edition of Wikipedia.

This Wikipedia contains  articles,  active users, and  administrators.

It was created on May 3, 2002 on a request of a Czech editor of the Esperanto Wikipedia. However, at that time, Wikipedia ran on UseMod software. The three pages the Czech version had at the time were lost during the switch to MediaWiki. The oldest currently available edit is from when the Main Page was recopied on November 14, 2002.  It reached 1,000 articles, many about Esperanto topics, on October 20, 2003.  An April 2004 report noted that it had 180 registered users at that time.

In June 2005, the Czech Wikipedia reached 10,000 articles and it reached 20,000 in December of the same year.  The Main Page was re-designed with more details after reaching this milestone.  By November 2006, it exceeded 30,000 articles, and became the 21st language version to exceed 100,000 articles in June 2008.  As of April 10, 2015 there are more than 319,100 articles, 29 administrators, almost 293,000 registered users, and dozens of very active contributors.  In December 2009, contributors to the Czech Wikipedia held a conference in Prague.

In 2008, the Czech NGO Wikimedia Česká republika (Wikimedia Czech Republic) was founded to support the Czech Wikipedia by organizing events, helping communication with authors of free content, and promoting the Czech Wikipedia to the public.

On February 10, 2018, the Czech Wikipedia reached 400,000 articles.

On March 21, 2019, Czech Wikipedia was temporarily shut down to protest against the articles 11 and 13.

On March 16, 2022, the Czech Wikipedia reached 500,000 articles.

See also
 Slovak Wikipedia

References

External links

  Czech Wikipedia
  Czech Wikipedia's chronicle, mostly documenting article numbers
  Czech Wikipedia mobile version

Wikipedias by language
Internet properties established in 2002
Czech encyclopedias
Czech-language websites